Harras is an album of improvised music by Derek Bailey, John Zorn & William Parker. The album was released by the Japanese Avant label in 1996. Towards the end of the track "Evening Harras" there is 10 minutes of silence followed by a Bailey solo. "According to Derek Bailey, the abrupt cutoff was planned. Derek wanted to end it "on a high". The Bailey solo material appended after the silence was apparently Zorn's idea."

Reception
The Allmusic review by Dean McFarlane awarded the album 3 stars stating "Evidently the candid session that took place on a night in New York resulted in a chaotic collision of ideas. With the performers being such strong voices individually, the abundant ideas fly in and out of the picture with no apparent regard to form; the session evolves from tepid beginnings into a no-holds-barred, rapid-fire assault on the senses. Fans of ultra-high-energy free improvisation will find it a delight to hear these three masters sparring on this one-off collaboration, making Harras a vital historical document which requires the gumption of a hardened avant-garde music fan to take the whole recording in one listen".

Track listing
All compositions by Bailey/Parker/Zorn
 "Morning Harras" – 12:35
 "Noon Harras" – 8:59
 "Evening Harras" – 36:00

Personnel
Derek Bailey – guitar
John Zorn – alto saxophone
William Parker – bass

References

Derek Bailey (guitarist) live albums
John Zorn live albums
1996 live albums
Avant Records albums